Drosophila grimshawi is a species of fruit fly from Hawaii, and was one of 12 fruit fly genomes sequenced for a large comparative study.

References

External links
 Drosophila grimshawi at FlyBase
 Drosophila grimshawi at Ensembl Genomes Metazoa
 

g
Insects of Hawaii